The 1950 GP Ouest-France was the 14th edition of the GP Ouest-France cycle race and was held on 22 August 1950. The race started and finished in Plouay. The race was won by Amand Audaire.

General classification

References

1950
1950 in road cycling
1950 in French sport